Pitcairnia heterophylla is a plant species in the genus Pitcairnia. This species is native to northern South America (Peru, Ecuador, Colombia, Venezuela), Central America, and central and southern Mexico.

The species was first discovered on top of the Rock of Guatapé by a German scientist.

Pitcairnia × daiseyana is a natural hybrid of P. heterophylla and P. pungens.

References

heterophylla
Flora of Central America
Flora of Mexico
Flora of South America
Plants described in 1840